40 West 4th Centre is a 331 ft, 22-story office skyscraper located in Dayton, Ohio. Upon its completion in 1969, it was the tallest building in Dayton, but was surpassed by the Kettering Tower one year later. It is now the fourth tallest building. It was designed by architect Paul H. Deneau.

See also
List of tallest buildings in Dayton, Ohio

External links
40 West 4th Centre

Skyscraper office buildings in Dayton, Ohio

Office buildings completed in 1969